Chelidonura sandrana is a species of sea slug, or "headshield slug", a marine opisthobranch gastropod mollusk in the family Aglajidae.

Distribution
This species lives from Tanzania to Australia.

Description

Ecology 
Chelidonura sandrana is a simultaneously hermaphroditic species. Contrary to classic theoretical predictions, Sprenger et al. (2011) have shown for the first time that the mating rate is largely unresponsive to variations in mate availability in this simultaneous hermaphrodite. With mating rates being close to the female fitness optimum, their findings challenge the prevailing notion of male-driven mating rates in simultaneous hermaphrodites, and call for complementary investigations of mating-rate effects on fitness through the male sexual function.

References
 This article incorporates CC-BY-2.0 text from the reference<ref name="Sprenger 2011">Sprenger D., Lange R. & Anthes N. (2011). "Population density and group size effects on reproductive behavior in a simultaneous hermaphrodite". BMC Evolutionary Biology 11: 107. .</ref>
 Yonow N. (2012) Opisthobranchs from the western Indian Ocean, with descriptions of two new species and ten new records (Mollusca, Gastropoda). ZooKeys 197: 1–129. [22 May 2012] 

 External links 
 Anthes N., Putz A. & Michiels N. K. (2006). "Hermaphrodite sex role preferences: the role of partner body size, mating history and female fitness in the sea slug Chelidonura sandrana". Behavioral Ecology and Sociobiology 60(3): 359-367. .
 Sprenger D., Anthes N. & Michiels N. K. (2008). "Multiple mating affects offspring size in the opisthobranch Chelidonura sandrana". Marine Biology'' 153(5): 891-897. .

Aglajidae
Gastropods described in 1973